Ashleigh Megan Plumptre (born 8 May 1998) is a professional footballer who plays as a centre-back for Leicester City in the English Women's Super League and the Nigeria national team. Formerly an England youth international, she made her senior Nigeria debut in February 2022.

Club career

Youth career
Born in Leicester, Plumptre grew up and attended primary school in Melton Mowbray. She began playing football at age 4 when she joined Asfordby Amateurs. At age 8 she joined the Leicester City Centre of Excellence, spending seven years with the club playing from under-10 to under-15 level. She left Leicester to join Birmingham City's under-17 team in 2013 where she also had the opportunity to train with the senior WSL 1 team. In 2014, Plumptre briefly joined third-tier FA Women's Premier League side Derby County's Centre of Excellence.

Notts County
Plumptre joined WSL 1 side Notts County in 2014. She made her senior debut on 24 August 2014, as a 57th minute substitute for Caitlin Friend in a 1–0 defeat to Liverpool. In doing so she become the youngest Notts County debutant at 16 years 108 days. She made her first start in a 1–1 WSL 1 draw with Manchester City on 3 September. Four days later she appeared as a  substitute at the start of extra-time during a League Cup semi-final defeat to Arsenal.

On 1 August 2015, Plumptre was an unused substitute for the 2015 FA Women's Cup Final, the first to be played at Wembley Stadium. She scored her first and only goal for Notts County on 30 August 2015 in a 5–0 League Cup group stage victory at home to second-tier Yeovil Town. Notts County also reached the League Cup final in 2015, losing to Arsenal 3–0 with Plumptre an unused substitute for the second consecutive cup final.

USC Trojans
In 2016, Plumptre moved to the United States to play college soccer at the University of Southern California. As a freshman she made 17 substitute appearances as a midfielder for the USC Trojans including in every round of the NCAA postseason. She played 27 minutes of the College Cup final as USC beat West Virginia 3–1 to claim the second National Championship in program history. She scored her first collegiate goal on 22 October 2017, the game winner in a 2–1 victory over Washington State. After only two starts in another 17 appearances as a sophomore, she became a starter as a junior in 2018, starting in 19 of 20 appearances. In 2019, Plumptre transitioned to playing centre-back and started all 23 of USC's games during the season that included a postseason run to the NCAA Tournament quarter-finals. Her performances were recognised individually with All-Pacific first team and All-Pac-12 second team honours in 2019. Majoring in human biology, Plumptre's academic success earned her Pac-12 academic recognition in 2017 and 2018. She was also named to the 2018 CoSIDA Academic All-District second team and 2019 United Soccer Coaches Scholar All-America second team.

LA Galaxy OC
In March 2019, Plumptre signed to play in the UWS with LA Galaxy OC during the college offseason. The team finished second in the West Conference behind Calgary Foothills during the regular season before winning the Championship final against the same opposition.

Leicester City
In December 2019, Plumptre elected to forgo the 2020 NWSL College Draft coming out of college despite projecting as a late-first round or early-second round pick and instead returned to England, rejoining hometown club Leicester City in the FA Women's Championship. The Foxes had reportedly also beaten FA WSL competition to her signature. She made her senior Leicester City debut on 19 January 2020, registering an assist on an Ella Rutherford goal in a 3–1 win over Crystal Palace. Plumptre's debut season with Leicester was limited to three league appearances as the season was curtailed as a result of the coronavirus pandemic. Leicester were awarded sixth-place on a points-per-game basis.

Ahead of the 2020–21 season, Leicester City Women were taken over by King Power having previously been an independent club with a formal affiliation to the Foxes. The club became fully professional for the first time in the process. On 4 April 2021, Leicester City clinched the league title with a 2–0 win over London City Lionesses, their twelfth consecutive league victory dating back to 4–1 defeat at the hands of the same opposition on 1 November 2020. The result earned Leicester their first ever promotion to the top-flight FA WSL. Despite a significant summer recruitment drive to attract WSL talent in the team's bid for promotion, Plumptre remained a key figure and played in all but one game during the title win as well as all four League Cup games as Leicester reached the knockout stage for the first time before defeat in the semi-finals.

International career

England
Plumptre has represented England at under-15, under-17, under-19 and under-23 level including at two tournaments: the 2014 and 2015 UEFA Women's Under-17 Championship. Predominantly a forward or attacking midfielder at youth level, she scored twice during a 9–0 win over Moldova in the 2015 UEFA Women's Under-17 Championship qualifying round. In 2016, 17-year-old Plumptre was the youngest player named to the under-23 team for the 2016 La Manga Tournament. She made a combined 30 appearances at youth level, scoring 10 goals.

Nigeria
Having earlier expressed an interest in representing Nigeria at senior level in June 2021, Plumptre received her first call-up for an eight-day training camp held in Austria the following month. She qualifies to play for Nigeria through her paternal grandfather, a Yoruba from Lagos. She made an unofficial debut on 23 July 2021, starting in a 1–0 friendly win over Slovenian 1. SŽNL club Olimpija Ljubljana. In November 2021, she attended a training camp in Nigeria. In late December 2021, she was officially cleared by FIFA to represent Nigeria. She made her official debut on 18 February 2022, starting in a 2–0 win over Ivory Coast during 2022 Africa Women Cup of Nations qualification.

Personal life
Plumptre's grandfather was born in Nigeria. She grew up supporting Leicester City and attended the parade when the men's team won the 2015–16 Premier League title.

In 2017, Plumptre was invited to the White House as part of USC's National Championship winning celebrations.

Career statistics

Club
.

International
Statistics accurate as of match played 06 October 2022.

Honours

College
USC Trojans
NCAA Division I Women's Soccer Championship: 2016

Club
Notts County
Women's FA Cup runner-up: 2015
FA Women's League Cup runner-up: 2015

LA Galaxy OC
UWS Championship: 2019

Leicester City
FA Women's Championship: 2020–21

References

External links

1998 births
Living people
Citizens of Nigeria through descent
Nigerian women's footballers
Women's association football central defenders
USC Trojans women's soccer players
Nigeria women's international footballers
Nigerian expatriate women's footballers
Nigerian expatriate sportspeople in the United States
Expatriate women's soccer players in the United States
Yoruba sportswomen
Nigerian people of English descent
Footballers from Leicester
English women's footballers
Leicester City W.F.C. players
Notts County L.F.C. players
Women's Super League players
Women's Championship (England) players
English expatriate women's footballers
English expatriate sportspeople in the United States
Black British sportswomen
English sportspeople of Nigerian descent
English people of Yoruba descent